Samuel Stephen Brett (25 December 1879 – 1939) was a Welsh professional footballer who played as a forward in the Football League for West Bromwich Albion.

Career statistics

References

1879 births
Welsh footballers
Sportspeople from St Asaph
Brentford F.C. players
English Football League players
Southport F.C. players
1939 deaths
West Bromwich Albion F.C. players
Wellingborough Town F.C. players
Southern Football League players
Midland Football League players
Association football inside forwards